Kondratovskaya is a rural locality (a village) in Puchuzhskoye Rural Settlement of Verkhnetoyemsky District, Arkhangelsk Oblast, Russia. The population was 173 as of 2010.

Geography 
It is located on the Severnaya Dvina River, 70 km north-west from Verknyaya Toyma.

References 

Rural localities in Verkhnetoyemsky District